Around the World and Back is the second studio album from American pop punk band State Champs.

Background
On February 13, the began recording their next album. Recording lasted for 38 days. On March  27, it was announced that the group had finished recording.

Release
In April and May 2015, the group supported All Time Low on their headlining US tour. They supported 5 Seconds of Summer on their headlining arena tour in Australia and New Zealand. On July 16, Around the World and Back was announced for release ion October., revealing its track listing and artwork. In addition, "Secrets" was made available for streaming. In July and August, the group embarked on a headlining US tour, dubbed The Shot Boys of Summer Tour. They were supported by Hit the Lights, Tiny Moving Parts, Let It Happen and Northbound. On August 9, "Losing Myself" was made available for streaming. On September 1, a music video was released for "All You Are Is History". On September 29, the title-track was made available for streaming. Around the World and Back was made available for streaming on October 12, before being released on October 16 through Pure Noise Records. In October and November, the group supported The Wonder Years on their headlining US tour.

In May 2016, the group supported A Day to Remember on their Just Some Shows tour in the US. In November and December, the group supported Sleeping with Sirens on their headlining US tour. On March 31, 2017, "Slow Burn" was made available for streaming. On April 19, the group released an acoustic version of "Secrets". In April and May, the group went on a headlining US tour with support from Against the Current, With Confidence and Don Broco. On May 5, the group released a deluxe edition of the album. It featured two acoustic versions of album tracks, two new songs, two live recordings and a DVD. The DVD was made available for streaming on November 2.

Reception

The album has received generally positive reviews from critics. Most critics cite Derek Discanio's vocals, and the album's overall sound. The band's inclusion of orchestration on tracks, the album's title track which features Ansley Newman of Jule Vera, and the production are noted as highlights. The record has drawn multiple comparisons to the work of genre albums like New Found Glory, A Day to Remember, and All Time Low.

Writing for Alternative Press, Evan Lucy praised the growth the band have showed since their debut. Lucy went on to say, "a new level of nuance and polish (is shown) here thanks to songwriting skills that are certainly a few notches more developed than many bands (in) their senior."

Davery Boy of Sputnikmusic, also wrote a positive review. He commended the band's ability to write catchy hooks and gave particular praise to "All or Nothing" and its fusion of the band's pop punk and alternative rock. Boy went on to write, "The quintet still perform pop punk better than many of their contemporaries...this LP sounds significantly more effective when played out loud, rather than through head or earphones....But it's difficult to ignore the feeling that they are capable of more."

Upon its release, the album peaked at number 30 on the US Billboard 200, and #3 on both the US Alternative and Top Rock Charts. Around the World and Back was nominated for Album Of The Year and "Secrets" was nominated for Song Of The Year at the 2016 Alternative Press Music Awards.

Track listing

Personnel

State Champs
Derek DiScanio – lead vocals
Tyler Szalkowski – lead guitar, backing vocals
Ryan Scott Graham – bass guitar, backing vocals
Tony "Rival" Diaz – rhythm guitar, backing vocals 
Evan Ambrosio – drums, percussion

Production
Kyle Black – production, engineering, mixing
Colin Schwanke – additional production, engineering
Devon Corey – engineering
Courtney Ballard – drum engineering
Ted Jensen – mastering

Charts

References

State Champs albums
Pure Noise Records albums
2015 albums